Bepress is a commercial, academic software firm owned by RELX Group. It began in 1999 as the  Berkeley Electronic Press, co-founded by academics Robert Cooter and Aaron Edlin. It makes products and services to support scholarly communication, including institutional repository and publishing software. Until September 2011 it also published electronic journals.

In August 2017, Bepress was acquired by RELX Group for an undisclosed amount, reported to be around £100 million ($129.3 million). The acquisition drew criticism from the library community.

Services

Open access publication tools 
 Digital Commons is an institutional repository and publishing software suite that allows institutions to showcase and preserve their scholarly output.
 Selected Works enables individuals to create their own scholarly research pages.

Submission and editorial management tools 
 ExpressO aids legal scholars in submitting their research to the law reviews of their choice.
 LawKit is a tool designed specifically for law review editors to track submissions, communicate with authors, and manage expedite requests.
 Edikit helps journal editors and conference organizers to manage the peer-review process.

Bepress portals 
 The Digital Commons Network is a discovery tool for all Digital Commons sites
 The Law Review Commons is an index to law reviews published using Digital Commons
 The Bepress Legal Repository allows scholars and interested individuals to browse subject matter repositories in Law.
 Cobra allows scholars and interested individuals to browse subject matter repositories in Biostatistics.

Journals 
Bepress published electronic journals in the social sciences, law, medicine, and natural sciences, before selling the portfolio to Walter de Gruyter in September 2011. It published its first journals in December 2000, with the exception of Studies in Nonlinear Dynamics and Econometrics, which existed as a peer-reviewed academic journal prior to its incorporation into the Bepress system. The journals included The B.E. Journal of Economic Analysis and Policy, The B.E. Journal of Macroeconomics, and The B.E. Journal of Theoretical Economics.

References

External links

 

Elsevier
Academic publishing companies
Publishing companies of the United States
Publishing companies established in 1999
Publishing companies based in Berkeley, California
1999 establishments in California
Software companies established in 1999
Academic journal online publishing platforms
2017 mergers and acquisitions